Benavent de Segrià is a village in the province of Lleida and autonomous community of Catalonia, Spain.

The town is located near the city of Lleida, and has a town square, bars, cafés, and small restaurants, as well as a church, and 2 parks in the area.

References

External links
 Government data pages 

Municipalities in Segrià